John George Coumantaros (born 1961) is a Greek-American businessman, the chairman of Flour Mills of Nigeria (FMN) since 2014, and its former CEO.

Early life
He was born in 1961, the son of George S. Coumantaros, who founded FMN in 1960. Coumantaros has a bachelor's degree in history from Yale University.

Career
Coumantaros began his career in 1984 with Southern Star Shipping (owned by his father), and has been president since 2009.

He has been president of Load Line Capital LLC, and a director of Oxbow Carbon LLC since 2007.

References

1961 births
John
Living people
Yale College alumni
Greek businesspeople